"Little Girl (With Blue Eyes)" is a non-album single by British band Pulp, released in 1985. It features very dark songs, far from the acoustic feel of the first album It. The four songs from the single are all included on the compilation album Masters of the Universe.

Track listing
All lyrics written by Jarvis Cocker, except "The Will to Power" lyrics by Russell Senior, all music composed by Pulp.

"Little Girl (With Blue Eyes)" – 3:28
"Simultaneous" – 4:09
"Blue Glow" – 3:06
"The Will to Power" – 3:25

Personnel
Jarvis Cocker – lead vocals, guitar
Russell Senior – guitar, violin, lead vocals on "The Will to Power"
Candida Doyle – keyboards, organ, backing vocals on "Little Girl (With Blue Eyes)"
Peter Mansell – bass
Magnus Doyle – drums

References

1985 singles
Pulp (band) songs
Songs written by Jarvis Cocker
Fire Records (UK) singles
1985 songs